Pennsylvania's 9th congressional district is located in the east central part of the state and encompasses all of Bradford, Columbia, Lebanon, Montour, Northumberland, Schuylkill, Sullivan, Susquehanna, and Wyoming counties, as well as parts of Berks, Luzerne, and Lycoming counties. Much of the district includes Pennsylvania's Coal Region. Republican Dan Meuser represents the district, serving since 2019.

Before 2019, the district was located in the southern part of the state and was a very safe seat for Republicans. According to the Cook Partisan Voting Index, in 2010 the 9th was the most Republican district in Pennsylvania (and the Industrial Midwest), then with a score of R+17. Redistricting slightly increased the number of Democrats in the district, with the addition of majority-Democratic Fayette County as well as some of the Democratic portions of Washington, Greene, Cambria and Westmoreland Counties. In 2014, the long-time Republican incumbent, former businessman Bill Shuster, won 52.8% of the vote in a three-way Republican primary race over retired Coast Guard search and rescue pilot Art Halvorson (34.5%) and livestock farmer Travis Schooley (12.7%). In the 2012 general election, he beat his Democratic opponent, nurse Karen Ramsburg, taking 62% of the vote.
In 2010, he won 73% of the vote, and in 2008 won 64%. Shuster was first elected to the district in 2001, effectively inheriting the seat from his father, Bud Shuster, who had held the seat since 1973. Shuster announced in January 2018 that he would retire from Congress at the end of his term, and did not run for re-election in 2018.

The Supreme Court of Pennsylvania redrew this district's boundaries in February 2018 after ruling the previous map unconstitutional, also re-assigning the number to a district in east central Pennsylvania–essentially, the successor to the old 11th district – for the 2018 elections and representation thereafter. Meanwhile, the bulk of the old ninth became the new 13th district, and is as Republican as its predecessor.

Recent election results in statewide races

List of members representing the district 

The district was created in 1795.

1795–1823: One seat

1823–1833: Three seats

1833–present: One seat

Recent election results

2012

2014

2016

2018

2020

2022

Historical district boundaries

See also
List of United States congressional districts
Pennsylvania's congressional districts

References

 
 
 Congressional Biographical Directory of the United States 1774–present

External links
 Congressional redistricting in Pennsylvania

09
Constituencies established in 1795
1795 establishments in Pennsylvania